Trypanaresta flava is a species of tephritid or fruit flies in the genus Trypanaresta of the family Tephritidae.

Distribution
United States, Costa Rica.

References

Tephritinae
Insects described in 1904
Diptera of North America